Haplomacrobiotus is a genus of tardigrades belonging to the family Calohypsibiidae.

Species:

Haplomacrobiotus hermosillensis 
Haplomacrobiotus utahensis

References

Parachela (tardigrade)
Tardigrade genera